28 Plastic Blue Versions of Endings Without You is the second LP by the Boston band Francine. It was released on February 4, 2003, by Q Division Records. The album's subdued and personal tone is a departure from Francine's first album, Forty on a Fall Day. Francine played scattered shows in the northeast USA after the album's release but did not tour. Considering, that this album has both fantastic songs and "miscues", it was received with mixed reviews.

Track listing 
 Technical Books
 Inside Joke
 Fake Fireplace Things
 This Sunday's Revival
 NASCAR
 Albany Brownout
 Silver Plated 606
 Oxygenated
 Ratmobile
 Novelty
 Uninstall
 Chlorine
 13 Years

Personnel 
 Clayton Scoble - vocals, guitar, photography
 Albert Gualtieri - guitar
 Steve Scully - drums, vocals
 Sean Connelly - bass, background vocals
 John Dragonetti - producer
 Rafi Sofer - engineer
 Jeff Lipton - mastering
 Jay Walsh - art direction

References 

2003 albums
Q Division Records albums
Francine (band) albums